Fernando Charrier (12 September 1931 – 7 October 2011) was the Roman Catholic bishop of the Roman Catholic Diocese of Alessandria della Paglia, Italy.

Ordained to the priesthood in 1956, Charrier became a bishop in 1984 and retired in 2007.

Notes

Bishops in Piedmont
People from Roure, Piedmont
1931 births
2011 deaths